Kysyl-Derevnya (Kıhıl Deriebine) is a rural locality (a selo) in Khatyn-Arinsky Rural Okrug of Namsky District in the Sakha Republic, Russia, located  from Namtsy, the administrative center of the district, and  from Appany, the administrative center of the rural okrug. Its population as of the 2010 Census was 258; up from 244 recorded in the 2002 Census.

References

Notes

Sources
Official website of the Sakha Republic. Registry of the Administrative-Territorial Divisions of the Sakha Republic. Namsky District. 

Rural localities in Namsky District
Populated places on the Lena River